Unionville Historic District is a national historic district located at Unionville, Centre County, Pennsylvania.  The district includes 173 contributing buildings and 3 contributing sites in the central business district and surrounding residential area of Unionville.  The buildings are primarily residential and date as early as 1848 and include a number of plan "I"-pan houses and other vernacular or folk house types.  Notable non-residential buildings include the Moses-Taylor Tavern, Peters Temperance House, Union Church, Methodist Church (c. 1860), Griest Store, and Union Grange Hall.

It was added to the National Register of Historic Places in 1979.

References

Historic districts on the National Register of Historic Places in Pennsylvania
Georgian architecture in Pennsylvania
Italianate architecture in Pennsylvania
Historic districts in Centre County, Pennsylvania
National Register of Historic Places in Centre County, Pennsylvania